Downtown Culiacán is the second urban sector and the central business district in the central area of Culiacán, Sinaloa, Mexico. The area features many of the city's operational offices, supermarkets, and every necessary stores.  It is the heart of Culiacán, being the point where the city was born, and at present, the connect point of the transport in the city.

Places of interest

Churches

Basílica de Nuestra Señora del Rosario
Basilica of Our Lady of the Rosary - The construction of the city's cathedral began on May 22, 1842 by bishop Lázaro de la Garza y Ballesteros. In 1885 completed its construction and on January 12, 1975 this church was elevated to the status of basilica by Pope Paul VI.

Santuario del Sagrado Corazón de Jesús
Sanctuary of the Sacred Heart of Jesus - Located in downtown, at junction of Ángel Flores street and Donato Guerra street, the Santuario del Sagrado Corazón de Jesús was built on 1908. The work was undertaken by the priest Jesús María Echavarría and the design of Luis F. Molina.

Culture

Centro Cultural Genaro Estrada
It is a complex of buildings that is conformed by theaters, art school, galleries and cinema. From the beginning of functions, the Centro Cultural Genaro Estrada has been an essential space for the development of the cultural life of Sinaloa. Opened in 1980, with the purpose of encouraging artistic and cultural activity in the state, has been the forum in which various cultural programs have been developed covering the most diverse artistic activities aimed at all ages.

 Pablo de Villavicencio Theater
 Socorro Astol Theater
 Rosario Castellanos Agora
 José Limón Arts School
 Sala Lumiére
 Young Art Gallery
 Antonio López Sáenz Gallery
 Modern Art Gallery
 Torek Gallery
 Hallway Gallery

Located at an apple, surrounded by Rafael Buelna street, Ave. Ruperto Paliza, Ave. Jesus Andrade and Paseo Niños Heroes, adjacent to Old Waterfront of Tamazula River.

Casino de la Cultura
Opened on June 5, 1943 as Casino Culiacán, starts architectural and urban modernity of the city. Example of sobriety of engineering for its architectural Art Deco style, the building was for nearly three decades the most important social center in the region.

Since the 70s the building was abandoned by its partners. However, for all that meant as undisputed meeting place for the local society for many years, the casino was rescued in 1994 by a decree of expropriation by the municipality, which respected much of its original structure. Thus, and as Casino de la Cultura, again has a chance to be reused, this time as a cultural center.

Located at the corner of two primary roads, Alvaro Obregon Avenue and Niños Heroes street, at the foot of the Old Waterfront of Tamazula River.

Regional Museum of Sinaloa
Founded as a museum of Culiacán, and inaugurated on December 14, 1958, the Regional Museum of Sinaloa is the oldest in the city. For half a century has been a space link with the past, strengthening the regional identity.

The building is located within the Constitution Civic Center complex, that integrates libraries, sports areas and zoo. His style is inscribed within the mainstream of architectural functionalism, with a simplicity and effectiveness of that era.

Museo de Arte de Sinaloa
The Sinaloa Art Museum (MASIN) is one of the most important venues for the exhibition of hundreds of visual arts assemblies in Culiacan: exhibitions of painting, sculpture, photography, drawing, graphics, installation, video and art-object; and is a key forum for performing arts, cultural and academic events, as concerts, book presentations, conferences, symposia and workshops of various artistic disciplines.

The building that houses it was built in 1837, and in 1890 it was remodeled by architect Luis F. Molina to become the Municipal Palace. From 1980 it was used as the headquarters of the municipal police. In 1990 it was renovated to accommodate the museum and opened as such on November 21, 1991.

Parks

Parque Revolución
Park located at downtown city, and house of the local basketball team Caballeros de Culiacán. The park area is in remodeling right now, including the basketball arena.

Centro Cívico Constitución
Opened in December 958, is undoubtedly an icon of the city, the zoo, is its most iconic image; currently, hanged by the space and the problem of their livelihood, remains being one of the most popular recreation centers in the capital.

Infrastructure

Buildings

Schools 
 Autonomous University of Sinaloa High School (Central Campus)
 Casa Blanca University
 COBAES 26 (Gral. Ángel Flores)
 COBAES 27 (Culiacán)

External links 
  H. Ayuntamiento de Culiacán — Official website
  Culiacán Travel Guide - Official website

Culiacán
1531 establishments in New Spain